Robert McGhee was a prominent Church of Scotland minister who championed the evangelical movement in Scotland throughout the second half of the 20th century. He was a signatory of the Manila Manifesto and was nominated for the position of Moderator several times. He was head of the Church's Board of Social Responsibility (one of the Church's six councils, and the largest voluntary provider of social care in Scotland) during the 1980s.

Background and education
McGhee was born in Port Glasgow, Renfrewshire, on 29 July 1929, the first son of Robert McGhee (who had set up various missions and Sunday Schools in some of Glasgow's most deprived areas) and Catherine Hawthorn Ferguson. He served two years in the Royal Air Force before training as an accountant. In 1954 he went up to Glasgow University to study Divinity and took his BD from Trinity College, Glasgow. Here he was influenced by William Barclay and was a contemporary of Revd Douglas Alexander, father of Cabinet minister Douglas Alexander and Leader of the Scottish Labour Party Wendy Alexander.

Ministry
He was ordained in Port Glasgow and inducted to Pultneytown St. Andrew’s Church in Wick, Caithness in 1959 as 9th minister of Wick. After a successful merge with another local church, he was minister of Wick St. Andrew’s and Thrumster Church from 1961 to 1966. From 1966 to 1972 he was 1st minister of Mayfield and Easthouses Church in Dalkeith outside Edinburgh, before moving finally to Falkirk, as 8th minister of St. Andrew's West Parish Church. During his time in Falkirk, he was appointed president of the Scottish Evangelistic Council (1982–1985), convener of Community Care (1977–1985) and then convener of the Board of Social Responsibility of the Church of Scotland (1985–1989). As convener he visited Kenya as part of the International Christian Federation Conference for the Prevention of Alcoholism and Drug Addiction, and also toured the Holy Land. As convener he was responsible for the reports presented to Margaret Thatcher after her notorious Sermon on the Mound in 1988, which were interpreted as a rebuke to her speech.

He also served as chairman of the Lord’s Day Observance Society of Scotland (1970–1974) and moderator of the Presbyteries of Caithness (1964–1965), Falkirk (1983–1983) and the Synod of Forth (1985–1986). In 1991 he was appointed chairman of the Glasgow Council for Billy Graham’s Scottish crusade.

Dr. McGhee made various television and radio appearances, often presenting "Late Call" on ITV, and was one of the most frequent speakers at the General Assemblies, taking a conservative, evangelical stance on theological issues. He was awarded an honorary Doctorate of Divinity. He was the nomination of the Church's powerful evangelical wing for the position of Moderator on several occasions, but was unsuccessful.

Dr. McGhee died on 18 March 1996 in Stirlingshire, of cancer. At his funeral the church was overflowing with over 1500 mourners, and he was buried in Falkirk Cemetery. The Very Revd Sandy McDonald (father of Doctor Who actor David Tennant) preached at his funeral. Dr. McGhee's family donated hundreds of theological books which were part of his private collection to the University of Glasgow. A stained glass window of St. John was erected in his memory in St. Andrew’s West Church, and a new residential street built in 2005 in central Falkirk, McGhee Place, was named after him.

References
"Who's Who in Scotland" (1994 edition), Carrick Media, Ayr
"Christian Irishman" magazine, April 1996 edition
Obituary from "The Scotsman", March 1996

See also
General Assembly of the Church of Scotland
McGhee Family

1929 births
1996 deaths
Clergy from Glasgow
Alumni of the University of Glasgow
20th-century Ministers of the Church of Scotland
Evangelists